Kożuchów is a town in Lubusz Voivodeship, Poland.

History
The town was founded in the 12th century, when it was part of the Kingdom of Poland. It was granted town rights in 1273 in the process of Ostdieslung. It became part of the Duchy of Głogów/Glogau under the Holy Roman Empire, ruled by the Piasts and Jagiellons until its dissolution in 1506.

While it was still a part of Austrian Silesia, the town became highly significant to German literature during the Baroque era. During the Thirty Years War in 1632, war poet Andreas Gryphius witnessed the pillaging and burning of Freystadt by the Protestant army of King Gustavus Adolphus of Sweden. Gryphius immortalized the sack of the city in a detailed account entitled Fewrige Freystadt, which made him many enemies.

In the Silesian Wars of the 18th century the town was annexed by Frederick the Great to the Kingdom of Prussia and, from 1871, was part of the Second Reich. After the defeat of Nazi Germany in World War II, Freystadt was renamed Kożuchów and was annexed to the People's Republic of Poland. The town's Silesian German-speaking population was forcibly expelled and replaced by an ethnic Polish population similarly expelled from the newly annexed Western regions of the USSR.

Defensive walls
At the turn of the 13th and 14th centuries Kożuchow was surrounded by fieldstone walls. The walls were up to 8 metres high and up to 2 metres thick. The fortifications of Kożuchow are among the best preserved in Poland. The walls and moat have survived for almost the entire medieval length.

Gallery

Notable people
Andreas Gryphius (1616-1664), important figure in German poetry during and after the Thirty Years War.
Margarete Kupfer (1881–1953), German actress
Karl-Ernst Schroeter (1912–1943), U-boat commander
Paul Tschackert (1848–1911), German Protestant theologian and historian
Julius von Verdy du Vernois (1832–1910), German general
Artur Pawlowski (1973~) Polish-Canadian Protestant street preacher ... active in 2020-21 [COVID-19 anti-mask and anti-lockdown activism]

Twin towns – sister cities
See twin towns of Gmina Kożuchów.

References

Cities and towns in Lubusz Voivodeship
Nowa Sól County